Andrew Brown  is a British-born journalist who spent most of his career in Hong Kong. He is best known for producing technology-related features for CNN, which he joined in 2000. He reported on humorous stories, like on machines which allegedly track women's hormonal cycles, translate animal sounds or control dreams. He has also reported on more serious topics like  computer passwords and Sars.
Previously, he reported on-air for CNBC Asia and TVB Pearl, both while based in Hong Kong.

In February 2010, he won almost £4.5 million in damages after having been paralysed at a UK hospital. A fundraising dinner was held for him in Hong Kong, where he worked for 15 years, in 2009.

References 

American television reporters and correspondents
Living people
Hong Kong journalists
Hong Kong people of British descent
CNN people
Year of birth missing (living people)